NovaBACKUP, developed by NovaStor is data protection software that enables SMB users to backup and recover data across a hybrid of physical and virtual machines. NovaBACKUP is designed to work on Microsoft Windows operating systems, offering local and online file backups and disaster recovery image backups.

Overview
NovaBACKUP uses a proprietary file format which uses an NBD file extension and is backwards compatible, meaning backups from older versions of NovaBACKUP (after version 8) can be restored with the latest version of the software. For version 7 and 8, the backups can still be restored, but the file extensions need to be updated to .NBD to do so.

Multiple NovaBACKUP editions are available. Versions built for SMB users support backups for PCs, laptops and Servers, including support for Exchange/SQL and virtual machines.

History
Release change log for NovaBACKUP starting at version 13.0. Current NovaBACKUP release log:

References

External links
NovaStor Official Website

Data protection
Data recovery software
Backup software